Corey Keyes is an American sociologist and psychologist. He is known for his work with positive psychology. Keyes currently teaches at Emory University in Georgia.

Work

Keyes works in the areas of complete mental health and methods for attaining positive social relationships.  He also studies the psychology of aging.  Keyes is known for coining the psychological terms "flourishing" and "Languishing"  which describes mentally healthy adults and has published widely in this field.  He is considered to be a pioneer in the field of positive psychology .  Keyes is a member of advisory board for the World Happiness Forum and is a member of the Positive Psychology Network.  His work has had wide reaching policy implications.  He has worked with the Center for Disease Control and "his model of mental health as a complete state has been used by the Public Health Agency of Canada in a national surveillance program."

Quotes
We are living longer — on average 30 years longer than at the start of the 20th century — yet we are not living healthier. The question is: Are we just living dependent and sick, or are we living healthy and able to contribute? 
I think we set up an impossible task, because our hedonistic version of happiness is impossible to sustain. But it is quite possible to feel fulfilled and content and that the world is meaningful by aligning yourself with some ideals, something that is bigger and better than you, and trying to live up to it.

Books
Women and Depression: A Handbook for the Social, Behavioral, and Biomedical Sciences. 2006, Corey L. M. Keyes (Editor), Sherryl H. Goodman (Editor) CUP, 978-0521831574
Keyes, CLM and Haidt, J (Editors). (2003). Flourishing: positive psychology and the life well-lived. American Psychological Association, Washington, DC.
Risk and Resilience in Human Development
Social Functioning and Social Well-Being

Education
B.A.  University of Wisconsin-Eau Claire
M.S.  University of Wisconsin-Madison
Ph.D. University of Wisconsin-Madison

References

External links

Living people
University of Wisconsin–Eau Claire alumni
University of Wisconsin–Madison alumni
American social psychologists
Emory University faculty
Year of birth missing (living people)